(Sanskrit: चुन्दी, ; ; pinyin: Zhǔntí Púsà) or  (चुन्दा), also known as  (सप्तकोटिबुद्धमत्ड़्, "Goddess of the Seventy Million (saptakoṭi) [Buddhas]"; ; pinyin: Qījùzhī Fómǔ), is a female bodhisattva and a manifestation of the Cundī Dhāraṇī prominently revered in East Asian Mahayana and Vajrayana Buddhism.

In Buddhist traditions
While Cundī is less well known in Tibetan Buddhism, she is revered in East Asian Buddhism. In China, she is known as Zhǔntí Púsà ("Cundi Bodhisattva") or Zhǔntí Fómǔ ("Cundi Buddha-Mother"). She is also sometimes considered a manifestation of Guanyin and in this form she is called Zhǔntí Guānyīn (Chinese: 準提觀音, "Cundi Avalokiteśvara"). She is known as Junje Gwan-eum Bosal (준제관음보살, Hanja: 准提觀音菩薩, "Cundi Avalokiteśvara Bodhisattva") in Korean, while in Japan she is known as Jundei Kannon (准胝観音, "Cundi Avalokiteśvara").

Robert Gimello observed that in  China, the esoteric Tangmi practices of Cundī were extremely popular among both the populace and the elite. The Tantric goddess Cundi was the object of popular occult practice in Chinese Buddhism from the Tang dynasty and continued afterwards with the adoption of esoteric teachings by other sects of Buddhism in China. In modern Chinese Buddhism, she is one of the more popular manifestations of Guanyin. She is also sometimes identified with Marīci or the Queen of Heaven. In Chinese Buddhist temples in Southeast Asia, statues of Cundī are traditionally enshrined in vegetarian halls (齋堂; zhaitang).

Source texts
In Hindu texts, she was considered a vindictive form of the goddess Durgā, or Pārvatī, wife of the god Śiva, before being syncretized into Buddhism.

This text is first dated to around the late 4th century CE to the early 5th century CE. Cundī and the Cundī Dhāraṇī are also featured in the Cundī Dhāraṇī Sūtra, which was translated three times from Sanskrit into Chinese in the late 7th century and early 8th century by the Indian esoteric masters Divākara (685 CE), Vajrabodhi (723 CE), and Amoghavajra (8th century).

Cundī Dhāraṇī 

In the sūtra, the Buddha speaks extensively about the various effects and benefits of reciting the Cundī dhāraṇī. Many of the effects are purifying and uplifting in nature. For example, after pronouncing the dhāraṇī, the Buddha then says:

The dhāraṇī is also closely associated with buddhahood and complete enlightenment (Skt. ). At the end of the sūtra, the Buddha closes the teaching by saying:
It is widely held that the dhāraṇī can bring about many benefits, even for lay practitioners. Some of the dhāraṇī's functions include praying for success in career; harmony in marriage and relationships; and academic achievements. It is particularly helpful for young adults looking for a job, a partner in life or hoping to be successful academically. However, the wishes you make must be reasonable and legitimate. Generally, a practitioner can recite the dhāraṇī 21, 27 or 49 times per day.

Iconography
Cundī is usually depicted with multiple arms. The most common form has eighteen arms, each wielding implements that symbolize upaya. Forms of Cundī with four, six, or sixteen arms can also be seen. The four arms of the four-armed form of Cundī symbolize the four immeasurables: loving-kindness or benevolence (maitrī), compassion (karuṇā), empathetic joy (muditā), and equanimity (upekṣā).

Gallery

See also
Chan
Pure Land Buddhism
Chandi

References

External links
 English translation of the Cundī Dhāraṇī Sūtra

Bodhisattvas
Avalokiteśvara
Buddhism in China
Yidams
Chinese gods
Investiture of the Gods characters